Princess Maria Ana Rafaela Micaela Gabriela Lourença of Braganza, full Portuguese name: Maria Ana Rafaela Micaela Gabriela Lourença de Bragança,  (3 September 1899 – 23 June 1971) was a member of the House of Braganza and the wife of Karl August, 10th Prince of Thurn and Taxis.

Family
Maria Anna was born at Schloss Fischhorn in Zell am See, Austria-Hungary (now in Austria), the fourth daughter of the Miguelist pretender to the Portuguese throne Miguel, Duke of Braganza and his second wife Princess Maria Theresa of Löwenstein-Wertheim-Rosenberg. Maria Anna's father was the head of the non reigning branch of the Portuguese Royal House that had been exiled from Portugal. The exile was the result of the Portuguese law of banishment of 1834 and the constitution of 1838 which was brought about because his grandfather Miguel I of Portugal had in 1828 usurped the throne of Portugal from Queen Maria II. Her grandfather reigned as king until 1834 when Maria II was restored. Those Portuguese who recognised Maria Anna's father as rightful king of Portugal acknowledged Maria Anna as an Infanta of Portugal.

Marriage and issue
Maria Anna married Prince Karl August of Thurn and Taxis, third eldest son of Albert, 8th Prince of Thurn and Taxis and his wife Archduchess Margarethe Klementine of Austria, on 18 August 1921 at Schloss Taxis in Dischingen, Baden-Württemberg, Germany. After their wedding they moved to Schloss Höfling. Maria Anna and Karl August had four children:

Princess Clotilde of Thurn and Taxis (born 30 November 1922 – 1 September 2009)
Princess Mafalda of Thurn and Taxis (born 6 March 1924 – 24 July 1989)
Johannes, 11th Prince of Thurn and Taxis (5 June 1926 – 28 December 1990)
Prince Albert of Thurn and Taxis (23 January 1930 – 4 February 1935)
Princess Maria Anna died in Feldafing, Bavaria, Germany.

Ancestry

References

1899 births
1971 deaths
House of Braganza
Portuguese infantas
Princesses of Thurn und Taxis
Dames of the Order of Saint Isabel
People from Zell am See
Burials at the Gruftkapelle, St. Emmeram's Abbey